Mordellistena uralensis is a species of beetle in the genus Mordellistena of the family Mordellidae. It was described by Csiki in 1915.

References

External links
Coleoptera. BugGuide.

Beetles described in 1915
uralensis